Charles Salis Kaelin (19 December 1858, in Cincinnati – 28 March 1929, in Rockport, Massachusetts) was an American impressionist painter.

Biography 
He studied under John Henry Twachtman between 1876 and 1879, after which time he moved to New York City and joined the Art Students League of New York. In 1893 he returned to Cincinnati and worked as a designer for several lithography companies. He moved to Rockport, Massachusetts in 1916, where he painted landscapes and ships. His work is in the collection of the Cincinnati Art Museum, where he exhibited regularly throughout his career.

References
Entry in Artists in Ohio, by Mary Sayre Haverstock, Jeannette Mahoney Vance, et al. On Google Books
Entry on the Getty Union List of Artist Names

External links
Artwork by Charles Kaelin

1858 births
1929 deaths
Artists from Cincinnati
People from Rockport, Massachusetts
19th-century American painters
American male painters
20th-century American painters
Painters from Ohio
Painters from Massachusetts
19th-century American male artists
20th-century American male artists